is a Japanese animation director most known for the anime adaptations of Saiyuki and Naruto.

Filmography

Films
Saiyuki: Requiem (2001)
劇場版 NARUTO-ナルト-　木ノ葉の里の大うん動会 (short, 2004)
Honō no Chūnin Shiken! Naruto Bāsasu Konohamaru!! (short, 2011)
Road to Ninja: Naruto the Movie (2012)

OVAs
Dennō Sentai Voogie's Angel外伝　進め！スーパー・エンジェルス！ (1998)

TV series
Flame of Recca (1997–1998) (episodes 15, 23, 29, 36 and 41)
Rerere no Tensai Bakabon (1999–2000)
Gensomaden Saiyuki (2000)
Kaze no Yojimbo (2001)
Naruto (2002–2007)
Tokyo Underground (2002)
Naruto: Shippuden (2007–2017)
Convenience Store Boy Friends (2017)
Gunjō no Magmell (2019)

References

External links

Anime directors
Japanese film directors
Japanese television directors
Living people
1962 births